The Real Freshman Handbook (1996) is a non-fiction book by Jennifer Hanson, which offers "an irreverent and totally honest guide to life on campus". Hanson provides advice on topics ranging from drinking to roommates to the weather.

External links
Review on bookreporter.com
Review on collegebound.net 

Self-help books
1996 non-fiction books